The War in Afghanistan was an armed conflict from 2001 to 2021. It began when an international military coalition led by the United States launched an invasion on Afghanistan, toppling the Taliban-ruled Islamic Emirate and establishing the internationally recognized Islamic Republic three years later. The conflict ultimately ended with the 2021 Taliban offensive, which overthrew the Islamic Republic, and re-established the Islamic Emirate. It was the longest war in the military history of the United States, surpassing the length of the Vietnam War (1955–1975) by approximately 6 months.

Following the September 11 attacks, U.S. President George W. Bush demanded that the Taliban immediately extradite al-Qaeda leader Osama bin Laden to the United States; the Taliban refused to do so without evidence of bin Laden's involvement. The U.S. declared Operation Enduring Freedom, as part of the earlier-declared War on Terror. Afghanistan was invaded and the Taliban and its allies were soon expelled from major population centers by the U.S.-led forces, supporting the anti-Taliban Northern Alliance; however, bin Laden relocated to neighboring Pakistan. The U.S.-led coalition remained in Afghanistan, forming a security mission (ISAF)—sanctioned by the United Nations—with the goal of creating a new democratic authority in the country that would prevent the Taliban from returning to power. A new Afghan Interim Administration was established, and international rebuilding efforts were launched. By 2003, the Taliban had reorganized under their founder, Mullah Omar, and began a widespread insurgency against the new Afghan government and coalition forces. Insurgents from the Taliban and other Islamist groups waged asymmetric warfare, fighting with guerrilla warfare in the countryside, suicide attacks against urban targets, and reprisals against perceived Afghan collaborators. By 2007, large parts of Afghanistan had been retaken by the Taliban. In response, the coalition sent a major influx of troops for counter-insurgency operations, with a "clear and hold" strategy for villages and towns; this influx peaked in 2011, when roughly 140,000 foreign troops were operating under ISAF command across Afghanistan.

A U.S. covert operation using bases in  Afghanistan led to the killing of Osama bin Laden in May 2011, and NATO leaders began planning an exit strategy. On 28 December 2014, NATO formally ended ISAF combat operations in Afghanistan and officially transferred full security responsibility to the Afghan government. Unable to eliminate the Taliban through military means, coalition forces (and separately, the Afghan government led by Ashraf Ghani) turned to diplomacy to end the conflict. These efforts culminated in the US–Taliban deal in February 2020, which stipulated the withdrawal of all U.S. troops from Afghanistan by 2021. In exchange, the Taliban pledged to prevent any militant group from staging attacks from Afghan territory against the U.S. and its allies. However, the Afghan government was not a party to the deal and rejected its terms. Coinciding with the withdrawal of troops, the Taliban launched a broad offensive throughout the summer of 2021, successfully reestablishing their control over Afghanistan, including the capital city of Kabul on 15 August. On the same day, the last president of the Islamic Republic, Ashraf Ghani, fled the country; the Taliban declared victory and the war was formally brought to a close. By 30 August, the last American military aircraft departed from Afghanistan, ending the protracted U.S.-led military presence in the country.

Overall, the war killed an estimated 176,000–212,000+ people, including 46,319 civilians. While more than 5.7 million former refugees returned to Afghanistan after the 2001 invasion, by the time the Taliban returned to power in 2021, 2.6 million Afghans remained refugees, while another 4 million were internally displaced.

Names 
The war is named the War in Afghanistan from 2001 to 2021 to distinguish it from other wars, notably the ongoing Afghanistan conflict of which it was a part, and the Soviet–Afghan War. From a western perspective, the war is divided between 2001 and 2014 (the ISAF mission), when most combat operations were performed by coalition forces, and 2015 to 2021 (the Resolute Support Mission), when the Afghan Armed Forces did most of the fighting against the Tailban. The war was named Operation Enduring Freedom from 2001 to 2014 and as Operation Freedom's Sentinel from 2015 to 2021 by the US. Alternatively, it has been called the US War in Afghanistan in certain countries. In Afghanistan itself, the war is known as simply the "War in Afghanistan" ( Jang dar Afghanestan,  Da Afganistan Jangra).

Prelude

Rise of the Taliban 
The Taliban emerged from religious students known as the Talib who sought to end warlordism in Afghanistan through stricter adherence to Sharia.  On 27 September 1996, the Taliban, with military support by Pakistan and financial support from Saudi Arabia, seized Kabul and founded the Islamic Emirate of Afghanistan. The Taliban imposed their fundamentalist Deobandi interpretation of Islam in areas under their control, issuing edicts forbidding women to work outside the home, attend school or to leave their homes unless accompanied by a male relative. According to the United Nations (UN), the Taliban, while trying to consolidate control over northern and western Afghanistan, committed systematic massacres against civilians. UN officials stated that there had been "15 massacres" between 1996 and 2001, many of them targeting Shia Hazaras.

By 2001, the Taliban controlled as much as 90% of Afghanistan, with the Northern Alliance confined to the country's northeast corner. Fighting alongside Taliban forces were some 28,000–30,000 Pakistanis (usually also Pashtun) and 2,000–3,000 Al-Qaeda militants.

Al-Qaeda 
The 9/11 Commission in the US found that under the Taliban, al-Qaeda was able to use Afghanistan as a place to train and indoctrinate fighters, import weapons, coordinate with other jihadists, and plot terrorist actions. While al-Qaeda maintained its own camps in Afghanistan, it also supported training camps of other organizations. An estimated 10,000 to 20,000 men passed through these facilities before 9/11, most of whom were sent to fight for the Taliban against the United Front. A smaller number were inducted into al-Qaeda.

After the August 1998 United States embassy bombings were linked to bin Laden, President Bill Clinton ordered missile strikes on militant training camps in Afghanistan. US officials pressed the Taliban to surrender bin Laden. In 1999, the international community imposed sanctions on the Taliban, calling for bin Laden to be surrendered. The Taliban repeatedly rebuffed these demands. Central Intelligence Agency (CIA) Special Activities Division paramilitary teams were active in Afghanistan in the 1990s in clandestine operations to locate and kill or capture Osama bin Laden. These teams planned several operations but did not receive the order to proceed from President Clinton. Their efforts built relationships with Afghan leaders that proved essential in the 2001 invasion.

September 11 attacks 

On the morning of 11 September 2001, a total of 19 Arab Muslim men—15 of whom were from Saudi Arabia—carried out four coordinated attacks in the United States. Four commercial passenger jet airliners were hijacked. The hijackers intentionally crashed two of the airliners into the Twin Towers of the World Trade Center in New York City, killing everyone on board and more than 2,000 people in the buildings. Both buildings collapsed within two hours from damage related to the crashes, destroying nearby buildings and damaging others. The hijackers crashed a third airliner into the Pentagon in Arlington, Virginia, just outside Washington, D.C. The fourth plane crashed into a field near Shanksville, in rural Pennsylvania, after some of its passengers and flight crew attempted to retake control of the plane, which the hijackers had redirected toward Washington, D.C., to target the White House, or the US Capitol. No one aboard the flights survived. The death toll among responders including firefighters and police was 836 as of 2009. Total deaths were 2,996, including the 19 hijackers.

Osama Bin Laden planned and coordinated the attacks, and the US desire to hold him accountable became the casus belli for invasion. Historian Carter Malkasian writes that "seldom in history has one man so singlehandedly provoked a war." Bin Laden sought, successfully, to draw the US into an extended war similar to that fought against the Soviets. The Taliban publicly condemned the 11 September attacks. They also greatly underestimated the US's willingness to go to war. The US was mistaken in its belief that the Taliban and al-Qaeda were almost inseparable when, in fact, they had very different goals and leaders.

US ultimatum to the Taliban 
Immediately after the 9/11 attacks, the United States National Security Council agreed that military action would probably have to be taken against Al-Qaeda and the Taliban. However, Bush decided to issue an ultimatum to the Taliban first. President Bush issued an ultimatum to the Taliban to hand over Osama bin Laden, "close immediately every terrorist training camp, hand over every terrorist and their supporters, and give the United States full access to terrorist training camps for inspection." The same day, religious scholars met in Kabul, deciding that bin Laden should be surrendered, however, Mullah Omar decided that "turning over Osama would only be a disgrace for us and Islamic thought and belief would be a weakness", and that the US would continue making demands after surrendering bin Laden, who he claimed was innocent. The Taliban refused the ultimatum, saying that Osama bin Laden was protected by the traditional Pashtun laws of hospitality.

In the weeks ahead and at the beginning of the US and NATO invasion on Afghanistan, the Taliban demanded evidence of bin Laden's guilt but subsequently offered to hand over Osama bin Laden to a third country if the US stopped its bombing and provided evidence of bin Laden's guilt. A Bush administration official later stated that their demands were "not subject to negotiation" and that it was "time for the Taliban to act now". Covert US military action began soon after, and the War started officially on 7 October 2001.

History

Tactical overview 
The War contained two main factions: the Coalition, which included the US and its allies (eventually supporting the Government of the Islamic Republic of Afghanistan); fighting against the Taliban, its allies, and its militias. Complicating the fight was Taliban splinter groups and other more radical religious groups such as al-Qaeda and later the Islamic State. These radical groups sometimes fought for the Taliban, sometimes fought for their own goals, and sometimes fought against both the Taliban and the Government.

Afghanistan is a rural country. In 2020, some 80% of its 33 million people lived in the countryside. This predisposes warfare to rural areas, and provides ample hiding spots for guerrilla fighters. The country also has harsh winters, which favors spring or summertime military offensives after winter lulls in fighting. 99.7% of Afghanistan is Muslim, which affected the ideology of both the Taliban and the Afghan government. Islam has historically allowed Afghan leaders to overcome tribal differences and conflict, and provided a sense of unity, especially against foreigners and non-believers. Centuries of foreign invasion by non-Muslims cemented the religious nature of resisting outsiders and the Afghan identity. The impact of local religious leaders (mullahs) is important in Afghanistan, and they could influence the population as much as the government. Mullahs have traditionally been important in prescribing resistance to outsiders through calls for holy war or jihad.

Afghanistan is a largely tribal society, and this significantly influences Afghan society and politics. Tribalism is largely a source of division, unlike Islam. Pashtuns are the largest ethnic group in Afghanistan, comprising between 38% and 50% of the population. Pashtunwali, the traditional way of life for the Pashtuns, guided most tribal decision making. Tribal unity was often weak as well due to Pashtunwali's method of dealing with feuds. Traditionally, Afghan leaders have depended on tribes to keep order in rural areas because without their cooperation the state was often ineffective and weak. Afghans were more loyal to their own community and tribe, not the state, which meant that tribes would align with either the Taliban or the Government as was most beneficial.

The significant difference in power between high-tech Coalition militaries and the guerrilla Taliban led to asymmetric warfare. Owing to their roots in the anti-Soviet Mujahideen, the Taliban carried on the guerrilla tactics developed in the 1980s. The Mujihdeen operated in small cadres of 10 to 50 men, armed with a combination of outdated and (usually looted) modern weapons. The Taliban increasingly used guerrilla tactics such as suicide, car and roadside bombs (IEDs), and targeted assassinations. By 2009, IEDs had become the Taliban's weapon of choice. The Taliban also used insider attacks as the war drew on, by planting personnel in the Afghan military and police forces.

2001–2002: Invasion and early operations 

Though the US officially invaded on 7 October 2001 by launching Operation Enduring Freedom, covert operations had begun several weeks earlier. Fifteen days after the 9/11 attack, the US covertly inserted members of the CIA's Special Activities Division into Afghanistan, forming the Northern Afghanistan Liaison Team. They linked up with the Northern Alliance in the Panjshir Valley north of Kabul. In October, 12-man Special Forces teams began arriving in Afghanistan to work with the CIA and Northern Alliance. Within a few weeks the Northern Alliance, with assistance from the US ground and air forces, captured several key cities from the Taliban. The Taliban retreated throughout the country, holding steady only in Kunduz Province, outmatched by US air support. By November, the Taliban had lost control of most of the country.

The US did not invade alone: it began with assistance from the UK, and eventually over a dozen more countries. The US and its allies drove the Taliban from power and built military bases near major cities across the country. Most al-Qaeda and Taliban were not captured, escaping to neighboring Pakistan or retreating to rural or remote mountainous regions. On 20 December 2001, the United Nations authorized an International Security Assistance Force (ISAF), with a mandate to help the Afghans maintain security in Kabul and surrounding areas. Its mandate did not extend beyond the Kabul area for the first few years. Eighteen countries were contributing to the force in February 2002.

Who would lead the country became an acute political question. At the Bonn Conference in December 2001, Hamid Karzai was selected to head the Afghan Interim Administration, which after a 2002 loya jirga (grand assembly) in Kabul became the Afghan Transitional Administration. The agreement provided steps that would lead to democracy for the country.

Shortly after the elevation of Karzai to the president on 5 December, the Taliban may have tried to seek a conditional surrender to Karzai. There are two conflicting accounts. The first is that an agreement, possibly signed by Mullah Omar, leader of the Taliban, was reached wherein the Taliban would surrender in exchange for immunity. The second is that the agreement was more narrowly focused on surrendering Kandahar. Taliban sources, on the other hand, say that Omar was not part of the deal and was not going to surrender Kandahar. Whatever the case, the US vetoed any sort of negotiation, in what historian Malkasian calls "one of the greatest mistakes" of the war. Omar disappeared, leaving either for another part of Afghanistan or Pakistan. The Taliban subsequently went into hiding, or fled to Pakistan, though many gave up arms as well. Most leaders and thousands of fighters went to Pakistan. Whether the Taliban had decided on an insurgency at this time is unknown. Taliban fighters remained in hiding in the rural regions of four southern provinces: Kandahar, Zabul, Helmand and Uruzgan.

By late November, bin Laden was at a fortified training camp in Tora Bora. The battle of Tora Bora began on 6 December. CIA teams working with tribal militias followed bin Laden there and began to call in airstrikes to clear out the mountainous camp, with special forces soon arriving in support. While the tribal militia numbered 1,000, it was not fighting eagerly during Ramadan. While the CIA requested that United States Army Rangers be sent and Marines were ready to deploy, they were declined. Bin Laden was eventually able to escape at some point in December to Pakistan.

The invasion was a striking military success for the Coalition. Fewer than 12 US soldiers died between October and March, compared to some 15,000 Taliban killed or taken prisoner. Special forces teams and their Afghan allies had done most of the work and relatively few soldiers had been required. Karzai was a respected, legitimate, and charismatic leader. Still, according to Malkasian, the failure to capture bin Laden or negotiate with the Taliban, or include them in any way in the new government, set the course for the long war that bin Laden had dreamed of getting the US into.

2003–2005: Taliban resurgence

Coalition mistakes, Taliban start to re-organize 
After initial success, the US lacked an obvious goal in Afghanistan beyond the counter-terrorism objectives of finding senior Taliban and al-Qaeda leaders. Nation-building was initially opposed by the Bush administration, but as the US stayed, it slowly crept into the rationale for staying. In April 2002, Bush made a speech expressing a desire to rebuild Afghanistan. The US also sought to instill democracy and women's rights as a moral matter. The international community contributed to the development effort in Afghanistan, which focused on aid and creating institutions to run the country. US reconstruction efforts also focused on improving education, health care, and community development. The US also supported and funded the creation of an Afghan army in early 2002. However, the army was built slowly due to competing interests and a US belief that the Taliban were no longer a strong threat. Some in the Bush administration preferred to use the Northern Alliance and warlords as the military instead of creating a new military. The army became an afterthought and was poorly trained and equipped, which further enabled the Taliban.

Some members of the Taliban reached out to Karzai to open negotiations several times between 2002 and 2004, but the US was adamantly against this and ensured that all top Taliban leaders were blacklisted, such that the Afghan Government could not negotiate with them. Historian Malkasian argues that negotiations with the Taliban would have been low cost but highly effective at this stage and chocks it up to US overconfidence and hubris, and notes that all the information that the Taliban could resurge was available but ignored. Some Taliban leaders considered joining the political process, with meetings on the issue until 2004, though these did not result in a decision to do so.

The first attempt at a larger organization of Taliban groups after the invasion occurred in April 2002 in the country's south. A shura was established by former mid-level Taliban officials in Gardi Jangal a refugee camp near the Helmand border. It operated in the core southern provinces of Kandahar, Helmand, Zabul, and Uruzgan. It was composed of 23 groups of about 50 individuals each, for a total of around 1,200. In the North Waziristan District of Pakistan, Jalaluddin Haqqani had started organizing the Haqqani network after exiling there in 2001. In early 2002 their manpower was estimated at 1,400 and had a presence in Paktia Province and Khost Province in the second half of 2002 with limited activity. They were joined by members of Al-Qaeda. Operation Jacana & Operation Condor, among others, tried to flush out the Taliban with varying results.

From 2002 to 2005, the Taliban reorganized and planned a resurgence. Pressure on Coalition forces to hunt down terrorists led to excesses and generated some popular support for the Taliban. Coalition troops would go on missions with questionable intelligence, at one point falling prey to a false tip provided by a target's political opponents. Few high-level Taliban or al-Qaeda leaders were caught. Those captured were predominantly low-level Taliban operatives who had little information on al-Qaeda. Numerous civilians were killed in operations, including a wedding which was misinterpreted as a Taliban gathering. Repeated errors by Coalition forces drove Taliban recruitment. Many Taliban leaders who had given up arms to leave peacefully, especially after being promised amnesty by President Karzai, were increasingly harassed by the US and elements of the Afghan government. By 2004, most Taliban leaders in Afghanistan had fled back to Pakistan, where the remnants of the Taliban were hiding. Malkasian argues that the US provided significant momentum to the Taliban by its own missteps, especially by focusing on aggressive counter-terrorism and vengeance for 9/11. He further argues that these actions alone did not restart the conflict because the Taliban would have re-emerged regardless because of leaders like Mullah Omar and Jalaluddin Haqqani who had never put down arms.

Fighting increases 
The Taliban undertook relatively few actions until 2005. Pamphlets by Taliban and other groups turned up strewn in towns and the countryside in early 2003, urging Islamic faithful to rise up against US forces and other foreign soldiers in a holy war. In May 2003, the Taliban Supreme Court's chief justice, Abdul Salam, proclaimed that the Taliban were back, regrouped, rearmed, and ready for guerrilla war to expel US forces from Afghanistan. Meanwhile, American attention was diverted from Afghanistan when US forces invaded Iraq in March 2003.

Privately, the Taliban were preparing a grand offensive against the Coalition. It was to be several years in the making so that enough strength could be gathered. Mullah Dadullah was put in charge of the offensive. Dadullah was effective but cruel. He was responsible for introducing suicide bombing into wide use around 2004, as previously the Taliban had not been enamored by suicide or taking civilian lives; that had been an al-Qaeda tactic. A network of madrassas in Pakistan catering to Afghan refugees provided a steady stream of extremist recruits willing to die.

As the summer of 2003 continued, Taliban attacks gradually increased in frequency. Dozens of Afghan government soldiers, NGO humanitarian workers, and several US soldiers died in the raids, ambushes, and rocket attacks. Besides guerrilla attacks, Taliban fighters began building up forces in the district of Dey Chopan District in Zabul Province. The Taliban decided to make a stand there. Over the course of the summer, up to 1,000 guerrillas moved there. Over 220 people, including several dozen Afghan police, were killed in August 2003. On 11 August 2003, NATO assumed control of ISAF.

Taliban leader Mullah Omar reorganized the movement, and in 2003 launched an insurgency against the government and ISAF. From the second half of 2003 and through 2004 operations started intensifying, with night letters followed by kidnappings and assassinations of government officials and collaborating village elders by 2005, with the former leaving villages in fear. Government schools and clinics were also burned down.

Operation Asbury Park cleared out Taliban forces in the Dey Chopan District during the summer of 2004. In late 2004, the then hidden Taliban leader Mohammed Omar announced an insurgency against "America and its puppets" (referring to transitional Afghan government forces) to "regain the sovereignty of our country". The 2004 Afghan presidential election was a major target of Taliban, though only 20 districts and 200 villages elsewhere were claimed to have been successfully prevented from voting. Karzai was elected president of the country, now named the Islamic Republic of Afghanistan.

From late June through mid-July 2005, United States Navy Seals carried out Operation Red Wings as a joint military operation in Kunar Province. The mission intended to disrupt local Taliban led by Ahmad Shah, hopefully bringing stability and facilitating the Afghan Parliament elections scheduled for September 2005. The operation was a pyrrhic victory for the Coalition, with only one survivor (dramatized in the 2013 film Lone Survivor) and 19 dead. Operation Whalers would finish the job several weeks later. Taliban activity dropped significantly and Shah was seriously wounded. Shah was not able to undertake any significant operations subsequent to Operation Whalers in Kunar or neighboring provinces.

The Taliban regained control over several villages in the south by the end of 2005, mostly because the villages were fed up with the lack of help from the government and hoped life would be better under the Taliban. Years of planning were coming to fruition for the Taliban. By comparison, the Government was in a very weak position. The police were deeply underfunded, and the average district had only 50 officers. Some districts had no Government presence at all. Most of the country's militias (with a strength of ~100,000) had been demobilized due to international pressure to create an army. But the army was still woefully understrength. Combined with an increase in tribal feuding, the conditions were perfect for a Taliban comeback.

2006–2009: Escalating war and NATO build-up 

As insurgent attacks in the country reportedly grew fourfold between 2002 and 2006, by late 2007 Afghanistan was said to be in "serious danger" of falling into Taliban control despite the presence of 40,000 ISAF troops.

Coalition diversifies, Taliban offensive 
From January 2006, a multinational ISAF contingent started to replace US troops in southern Afghanistan. The UK formed the core of the force, along with Australia, Canada, the Netherlands, and Estonia. In January 2006, NATO's focus in southern Afghanistan was to form Provincial Reconstruction Teams. Local Taliban figures pledged to resist. Since Canada wanted to deploy in Kandahar, the UK got Helmand province. Helmand was a center of poppy production, so it seemed a good region for the anti-narcotic focused UK. In hindsight, the UK were a poor choice. Pashtun Helmandis had never forgotten the 1880 Battle of Maiwand near Helmand province; a popular rumour was that the British sought to avenge their loss in that battle. The British had long since forgotten the war, but it proved a source of significant resistance from the Afghan population.

Local intelligence suggested that the Taliban were going to wage a brutal campaign in the summer of 2006. Coalition generals sent this info up the chain of command, but decision-makers ignored warnings. The US was distracted in Iraq, and Secretary of State Rumsfeld was more interested in making the Afghan army affordable than effective. Of the 70,000 soldiers the Afghan army was supposed to have, only 26,000 had been trained and retained.

Spring and summer action in 2006 by the Coalition included Operation Mountain Thrust, Operation Medusa, a Dutch/Australian offensive, the Battle of Panjwaii, Operation Mountain Fury and Operation Falcon Summit. The Coalition achieved tactical victories and area denial, but the Taliban were not completely defeated.

On 29 May 2006, a US military truck that was part of a convoy in Kabul lost control and plowed into civilian vehicles, killing one person and injuring six. The surrounding crowd got angry and a riot arose, lasting all day ending with 20 dead and 160 injured. When stone-throwing and gunfire had come from a crowd of some 400 men, the US troops had used their weapons "to defend themselves" while leaving the scene, a US military spokesman said. A correspondent for the Financial Times in Kabul suggested that this was the outbreak of "a ground swell of resentment" and "growing hostility to foreigners" that had been growing and building since 2004.

UK actions in early 2007 included Operation Volcano, Operation Achilles, and Operation Lastay Kulang. The UK Ministry of Defence also announced its intention to bring British troop levels in the country up to 7,700.

On 4 March 2007, US Marines killed at least 12 civilians and injured 33 in Shinwar district, Nangarhar, in a response to a bomb ambush. The event became known as the "Shinwar massacre". The 120 member Marine unit responsible for the attack were ordered to leave the country because the incident damaged the unit's relations with the local population.

During the summer, NATO forces achieved tactical victories at the Battle of Chora in Orūzgān, where Dutch and Australian ISAF forces were deployed.

The Battle of Musa Qala took place in December. Afghan units were the principal fighting force, supported by British forces. Taliban forces were forced out of the town.

On 13 June 2008, Taliban fighters demonstrated their ongoing strength, liberating all prisoners in Kandahar jail. The operation freed 1200 prisoners, 400 of whom were Taliban, causing a major embarrassment for NATO. By the end of 2008, the Taliban apparently had severed remaining ties with al-Qaeda. According to senior US military intelligence officials, perhaps fewer than 100 members of al-Qaeda remained in Afghanistan.

June 2009 brought Operation Strike of the Sword in Helmand. It followed a British-led operation named Operation Panther's Claw in the same region, which was aimed to secure various canal and river crossings to establish a long-term ISAF presence.

On 4 September 2009, during the Kunduz Province Campaign a devastating NATO air raid was conducted 7 kilometers southwest of Kunduz where Taliban fighters had hijacked civilian supply trucks, killing up to 179 people, including over 100 civilians.

In December 2009, an attack on Forward Operating Base Chapman, used by the CIA to gather information and to coordinate drone attacks against Taliban leaders, killed eight working for the CIA.

Troop surge 

In March 2007, the US deployed some 3,500 more troops, though the pace of deployment was slow due to American priorities in Iraq. In the first five months of 2008, the number of US troops in Afghanistan increased by over 80% with a surge of 21,643 more troops, bringing the total from 26,607 in January to 48,250 in June. In September 2008, President Bush announced the withdrawal of over 8,000 from Iraq and a further increase of up to 4,500 in Afghanistan. The same month, the UK lost its 100th serviceperson.

January 2009 brought a change in American leadership, with the election of President Barack Obama. That month US soldiers, alongside Afghan Federal Guards, moved into the provinces of Logar, Wardak, and Kunar. The troops were the first wave of an expected surge of reinforcements originally ordered by President Bush and increased by President Obama. In mid-February 2009, it was announced that 17,000 additional troops would be deployed in two brigades and support troops; the 2nd Marine Expeditionary Brigade of about 3,500 and the 5th Brigade, 2nd Infantry Division, a Stryker Brigade with about 4,000. ISAF commander General David McKiernan had called for as many as 30,000 additional troops, effectively doubling the number of troops. On 23 September, a classified assessment by General McChrystal included his conclusion that a successful counterinsurgency strategy would require 500,000 troops and five years.

On 1 December 2009, Obama announced that the US would send 30,000 more troops. Antiwar organizations in the US responded quickly, and cities throughout the US saw protests on 2 December. Many protesters compared the decision to deploy more troops in Afghanistan to the expansion of the Vietnam War under the Johnson administration.

US action into Pakistan 

In the early years of the war, Pakistan had been seen as a firm ally, and little concern had been given to its support of the Taliban. Pakistan had also helped capture numerous top al-Qaeda leaders, including Khalid Sheikh Mohammed. But internally, Pakistan was providing significant funding, access to safe houses, and political support to the Taliban. Public opinion in Pakistan heavily favored the Taliban, and the US invasion was viewed very negatively. The government was in no position to expel the Taliban, lest it starts a conflict within its already fragile country. Thus the Taliban continued to use Pakistan as a base of operations and a safe haven to rebuild their strength.

The US had been using drone strikes in Pakistan since 2004, starting along the Federal Tribal Areas against Taliban and Al-Qaeda militants.

In the summer of 2008, President Bush issued an order authorizing raids against militants in Pakistan. Pakistan said it would not allow foreign forces onto its territory and that it would vigorously protect its sovereignty. In September, the Pakistan military stated that it had issued orders to "open fire" on US soldiers who crossed the border in pursuit of militant forces.

On 3 September 2008, US commandos landed by helicopter and attacked three houses close to a known enemy stronghold in Pakistan. Pakistan condemned the attack, calling the incursion "a gross violation of Pakistan's territory". On 6 September, in an apparent reaction, Pakistan announced an indefinite disconnection of supply lines to NATO forces. A further split occurred when Pakistani soldiers fired on Nato aircraft which had crossed the border on 25 September. However, despite tensions, the US increased the use of remotely piloted drone aircraft in Pakistan's border regions, in particular the Federal Tribal Areas and Balochistan; by 2009, drone attacks were up 183% since 2006.

Pakistani drone strikes against Taliban and al-Qaeda militants increased substantially under President Obama. Some in the media have referred to the attacks as a "drone war". In August 2009, Baitullah Mehsud, the leader of the Tehrik-i-Taliban Pakistan was killed in a drone strike.

Re-election of Karzai 

After Karzai's alleged win of 54 percent, which would prevent a runoff, over 400,000 Karzai votes had to be disallowed after accusations of fraud. Some nations criticized the elections as "free but not fair".

The Taliban's claim that the over 135 violent incidents disrupted elections was largely disputed. However, the media was asked to not report any violent incidents. In southern Afghanistan where the Taliban held the most power, voter turnout was low and sporadic violence was directed at voters and security personnel. The Taliban released a video days after the elections, filming on the road between Kabul and Kandahar, stopping vehicles and asking to see their fingers (voters were marked by dipping their fingers in ink so they could not double vote). The video went showed ten men who had voted, listening to a Taliban militant. The Taliban pardoned the voters because of Ramadan. The Taliban attacked towns with rockets and other indirect fire. Amid claims of widespread fraud, both top contenders, Hamid Karzai and Abdullah Abdullah, claimed victory. Reports suggested that turnout was lower than in the prior election.

On 26 November 2009, Karzai made a public plea for direct negotiations with the Taliban leadership. Karzai said there is an "urgent need" for negotiations and made it clear that the Obama administration had opposed such talks. There was no formal US response.

Taliban status and strategy 
In 2007, after more than 5 years of war, Western officials and analysts estimated the strength of Taliban forces at about 10,000 fighters fielded at any given time. Of that number, only 2,000 to 3,000 were highly motivated, full-time insurgents. The rest were volunteer units, made up of young Afghans, angered by deaths of Afghan civilians in military airstrikes and American detention of Muslim prisoners who had been held for years without being charged. In 2007, more foreign fighters came into Afghanistan than ever before, according to officials. Approximately 100 to 300 full-time combatants were foreigners, many from Pakistan, Uzbekistan, Chechnya, various Arab countries and perhaps even Turkey and western China. They were reportedly more violent, uncontrollable and extreme, often bringing superior video-production or bomb making expertise. By 2010 the Taliban had as many as 25,000 dedicated soldiers, almost as many as before 9/11.

General McChrystal, newly appointed as US commander in Afghanistan, said that the Taliban had gained the upper hand. In a continuation of the Taliban's usual strategy of summer offensives, the militants aggressively spread their influence into north and west Afghanistan and stepped up their attack in an attempt to disrupt presidential polls. Calling the Taliban a "very aggressive enemy", he added that the US strategy was to stop their momentum and focus on protecting and safeguarding Afghan civilians, calling it "hard work".

2010–2013: Coalition offensives and strategic agreements 

Deployment of additional US troops continued in early 2010, with 9,000 of the planned 30,000 in place before the end of March and another 18,000 expected by June. The surge in troops supported a sixfold increase in Special Forces operations. The surge of American personnel that began in late 2009 ended by September 2012. 700 airstrikes occurred in September 2010 alone versus 257 in all of 2009.

Due to increased use of IEDs by insurgents, the number of injured Coalition soldiers, mainly Americans, significantly increased. Beginning in May 2010 NATO special forces began to concentrate on operations to capture or kill specific Taliban leaders. As of March 2011, the US military claimed that the effort had resulted in the capture or killing of more than 900 low- to mid-level Taliban commanders. Overall, 2010 saw the most insurgent attacks of any year since the war began, peaking in September at more than 1,500.

The CIA created Counter-terrorism Pursuit Teams staffed by Afghans at the war's beginning. This force grew to over 3,000 by 2010 and was considered one of the "best Afghan fighting forces". These units were not only effective in operations against the Taliban and al-Qaeda forces in Afghanistan, but also expanded their operations into Pakistan.

In February 2010, Coalition and Afghan forces began highly visible plans for an offensive, codenamed Operation Moshtarak, on the Taliban stronghold near the village of Marjah. It was the first operation where Afghan forces led the coalition. The offensive involved 15,000 Coalition and Afghan troops.

The Battle of Kandahar (2011) was part of an offensive that followed a 30 April announcement that the Taliban would launch their spring offensive. On 7 May the Taliban launched a major offensive on government buildings in Kandahar. The Taliban said their goal was to take control of the city. At least eight locations were attacked: the governor's compound, the mayor's office, the NDS headquarters, three police stations and two high schools. The battle continued onto a second day. The BBC called it "the worst attack in Kandahar province since the fall of the Taliban government in 2001, and an embarrassment for the Western-backed Afghan government."

Peace negotiations 

By 2009 there was broad agreement in Afghanistan that the war should end, but how it should happen was a major issue for the candidates of the 2009 Afghan presidential election that re-elected Karzai. In a televised speech after being elected, Karzai called on "our Taliban brothers to come home and embrace their land" and laid plans to launch a loya jirga. Efforts were undermined by the Obama administration's increase of American troops in the country. Karzai reiterated at a London conference in January 2010 that he wanted to reach out to the Taliban to lay down arms. US Secretary of State Hillary Clinton cautiously supported the proposal. The "Peace Jirga" was held in Kabul, attended by 1,600 delegates, in June 2010. However, the Taliban and the Hezb-i Islami Gulbuddin, who were both invited by Karzai as a gesture of goodwill did not attend the conference.

The Taliban's co-founder and then-second-in-command, Abdul Ghani Baradar, was one of the leading Taliban members who favored talks with the US and Afghan governments. Karzai's administration reportedly held talks with Baradar in February 2010; however, later that month, Baradar was captured in a joint US-Pakistani raid in the city of Karachi in Pakistan. The arrest infuriated Karzai and invoked suspicions that he was seized because the Pakistani intelligence community was opposed to Afghan peace talks. Karzai started peace talks with Haqqani network groups in March 2010.

A mindset change and strategy occurred within the Obama administration in 2010 to allow possible political negotiations to solve the war. The Taliban themselves had refused to speak to the Afghan government, portraying them as an American "puppet". Sporadic efforts for peace talks between the US and the Taliban occurred afterward, and it was reported in October 2010 that Taliban leadership commanders (the "Quetta Shura") had left their haven in Pakistan and been safely escorted to Kabul by NATO aircraft for talks, with the assurance that NATO staff would not apprehend them. After the talks concluded, it emerged that the leader of this delegation, who claimed to be Akhtar Mansour, the second-in-command of the Taliban, was actually an imposter who had duped NATO officials.

Karzai confirmed in June 2011 that secret talks were taking place between the US and the Taliban, but these collapsed by August 2011. Further attempts to resume talks were canceled in March 2012, and June 2013 following a dispute between the Afghan government and the Taliban regarding the latter's opening of a political office in Qatar. President Karzai accused the Taliban of portraying themselves as a government in exile. In July 2015, Pakistan hosted the first official peace talks between Taliban representatives and the Afghan government. U.S. and China attended the talks brokered by Pakistan in Murree as two observers. In January 2016, Pakistan hosted a round of four-way talks with Afghan, Chinese and American officials, but the Taliban did not attend. The Taliban did hold informal talks with the Afghan government in 2016.

Wikileaks, discipline issues 

On 25 July 2010, the release of 91,731 classified documents from the WikiLeaks organization was made public. The documents cover US military incident and intelligence reports from January 2004 to December 2009. Some of these documents included sanitized, and "covered up", accounts of civilian casualties caused by Coalition Forces. The reports included many references to other incidents involving civilian casualties like the Kunduz airstrike and Nangar Khel incident. The leaked documents also contain reports of Pakistan collusion with the Taliban. According to Der Spiegel, "the documents clearly show that the Pakistani intelligence agency Inter-Services Intelligence (usually known as the ISI) is the most important accomplice the Taliban has outside of Afghanistan."

Beginning in January 2012, incidents involving US troops occurred that were described by The Sydney Morning Herald as "a series of damaging incidents and disclosures involving US troops in Afghanistan." These incidents created fractures in the partnership between Afghanistan and ISAF, raised the question whether discipline within US troops was breaking down, undermined "the image of foreign forces in a country where there is already deep resentment owing to civilian deaths and a perception among many Afghans that US troops lack respect for Afghan culture and people" and strained the relations between Afghanistan and the United States. Besides an incident involving US troops who posed with body parts of dead insurgents and a video apparently showing a US helicopter crew singing "bye-bye Miss American Pie" before blasting a group of Afghan men with a Hellfire missile these "high-profile US military incidents in Afghanistan" also included the 2012 Afghanistan Quran burning protests and the Panjwai shooting spree.

Pakistan-US tensions 

Tensions between Pakistan and the US were heightened in late September after several Pakistan Frontier Corps soldiers were killed and wounded. The troops were attacked by a US piloted aircraft that was pursuing Taliban forces near the Afghan-Pakistan border, but for unknown reasons opened fire on two Pakistan border posts. In retaliation for the strike, Pakistan closed the Torkham ground border crossing to NATO supply convoys for an unspecified period. This incident followed the release of a video allegedly showing uniformed Pakistan soldiers executing unarmed civilians. After the Torkham border closing, Pakistani Taliban attacked NATO convoys, killing several drivers and destroying around 100 tankers.

ISAF forces skirmished Pakistan's armed forces on 26 November, killing 24 Pakistani soldiers. Each side claimed the other shot first. Pakistan blocked NATO supply lines and ordered Americans to leave Shamsi Airfield.

Killing of Osama bin Laden 
On 2 May 2011, US officials announced that al-Qaeda leader Osama bin Laden had been killed in Operation Neptune Spear, conducted by the US Navy SEALs, in Abbottabad, Pakistan. Pakistan came under intense international scrutiny after the raid. The Pakistani government denied that it had sheltered bin Laden, and said it had shared information with the CIA and other intelligence agencies about the compound since 2009.

International drawdown and strategic agreements 

On 22 June President Obama announced that 10,000 troops would be withdrawn by the end of 2011 and an additional 23,000 troops would return by the summer of 2012. After the withdrawal of 10,000 US troops, only 80,000 remained. In July 2011 Canada withdrew its combat troops, transitioning to a training role. Following suit, other NATO countries announced troop reductions.

Taliban attacks continued at the same rate as they did in 2011, around 28,000 in 2013.

In January 2012, the National Front of Afghanistan (NFA) raised concerns about the possibility of a secret deal between the US, Pakistan and the Taliban during a widely publicized meeting in Berlin.

Karzai visited the US in January 2012. At the time the US Government stated its openness to withdrawing all of its troops by the end of 2014. On 11 January 2012 Karzai and Obama agreed to transfer combat operations from NATO to Afghan forces by spring 2013 rather than summer 2013. "What's going to happen this spring is that Afghans will be in the lead throughout the country", Obama said. "They [ISAF forces] will still be fighting alongside Afghan troops...we will be in a training, assisting, advising role." He also stated the reason of the withdrawals that "We achieved our central goal, or have come very close...which is to de-capacitate al-Qaeda, to dismantle them, to make sure that they can't attack us again." He added that any US mission beyond 2014 would focus solely on counterterrorism operations and training.

On 2 May 2012, Presidents Karzai and Obama signed a strategic partnership agreement between the two countries, after the US president had arrived unannounced in Kabul. On 7 July, as part of the agreement, the US designated Afghanistan a major non-NATO ally after Karzai and Clinton met in Kabul. Both leaders agreed that the United States would transfer Afghan prisoners and prisons to the Afghan government and withdraw troops from Afghan villages in spring 2013.

Security transfer 
In 2012 the leaders of NATO-member countries endorsed an exit strategy during the NATO Summit. ISAF Forces would transfer command of all combat missions to Afghan forces by the middle of 2013, while shifting from combat to advising, training and assisting Afghan security forces. Most of the 130,000 ISAF troops would depart by the end of December 2014. A new NATO mission would then assume the support role.

On 18 June 2013 the transfer of security responsibilities from NATO to Afghan forces was completed. ISAF remained slated to end its mission by the end of 2014. Some 100,000 ISAF forces remained in the country.

2014–2017: Withdrawal and increase of insurgency 

After 13 years Britain and the United States officially ended their combat operation in Afghanistan on 26 October 2014. On that day Britain handed over its last base in Afghanistan, Camp Bastion, while the United States handed over its last base, Camp Leatherneck, to Afghan forces. Around 500 UK troops remained in "non-combat" roles. On 28 December 2014 NATO officially ended combat operations in a ceremony held in Kabul. Continued operations by United States forces within Afghanistan were under Operation Freedom's Sentinel; this was joined by a new NATO mission under the name of Operation Resolute Support.

The withdrawal of troops did not mean the withdrawal of military presence. As US troops withdrew from Afghanistan, they were replaced by private security companies hired by the United States government and the United Nations. Many of these private security companies (also termed military contractors) consisted of ex-Coalition military personnel. This allowed the US and British to continue to be involved in ground actions without the requirement to station their own forces.

The Taliban began a resurgence due to several factors. At the end of 2014, the US and NATO combat mission ended and the withdrawal of most foreign forces from Afghanistan reduced the risk the Taliban faced of being bombed and raided. In June 2014, the Pakistani military's Operation Zarb-e-Azb, launched in the North Waziristan tribal area in June 2014, dislodged thousands of mainly Uzbek, Arab and Pakistani militants, who flooded into Afghanistan and swelled the Taliban's ranks. The group was further emboldened by the comparative lack of interest from the international community and the diversion of its attention to crisis in other parts of the world, such as Syria, Iraq or Ukraine. Afghan security forces also lack certain capabilities and equipment, especially air power and reconnaissance. The political infighting in the central government in Kabul and the apparent weakness in governance at different levels are also exploited by the Taliban.

On 22 June 2015, the Taliban detonated a car bomb outside the National Assembly in Kabul, and Taliban fighters attacked the building with assault rifles and RPGs.

On 12 April 2016, the Taliban announced that they would launch an offensive called Operation Omari.

As of July 2016, Time magazine estimated that at least 20% of Afghanistan was under Taliban control with southernmost Helmand Province as major stronghold, while General Nicholson stated that Afghan official armed forces' casualties had risen 20 percent compared to 2015.

On 22 September 2016, the Afghan government signed a draft peace deal with Hezb-i-Islami. According to the draft agreement, Hezb-i-Islami agreed to cease hostilities, cut ties to extremist groups and respect the Afghan Constitution, in exchange for government recognition of the group and support for the removal of United Nations and American sanctions against its leader Gulbuddin Hekmatyar, who was also promised an honorary post in the government. It was the first peace treaty since the war in Afghanistan started in 2001. Government officials praised the deal as a step towards peace and potentially a deal with the Taliban too. However others shared concern due to controversial leader Hekmatyar's alleged war crimes; some parts of Afghan society protested the peace treaty due to his past actions.

In early January 2017, the Marine Corps Times reported that Afghan forces seek to rebuild, following an exhausting 2016 fighting season; 33 districts, spread across 16 Afghan provinces, were under insurgent control whilst 258 are under government control and nearly 120 districts remained "contested". According to an inspector general, the Afghan army comprises about 169,000 soldiers, but in 2016 they suffered a 33 percent attrition rate—a 7 percent increase from 2015. On 9 February 2017, General John Nicholson told Congress that NATO and allied forces in Afghanistan are facing a "stalemate" and that he needed a few thousand additional troops to more effectively train and advise Afghan soldiers. He also asserted that Russia was trying to "legitimize" the Taliban by creating the "false narrative" that the militant organization has been fighting the Islamic State and that Afghan forces have not, he asserted Russia's goal, was "to undermine the United States and NATO" in Afghanistan. However, he said that the area in which Islamic State fighters operate in Afghanistan had been greatly reduced.

On 21 April 2017, the Taliban attacked Camp Shaheen near Mazar-e-Sharif, killing over 140256 Afghan soldiers.

The bloody 2017 Taliban spring offensive was named Operation Mansouri.

The Washington Post reported that on 20 November 2017, General John Nicholson announced that US aircraft were targeting drug production facilities in Afghanistan under a new strategy aimed at cutting off Taliban funding, saying that the Taliban was "becoming a criminal organization" that was earning about $200 million a year from drug-related activities. President Ashraf Ghani strongly endorsed the new campaign of US and Afghan airstrikes against the Taliban-run narcotic centers.

Battle of Kunduz 

Heavy fighting occurred in the Kunduz province, which was the site of clashes from 2009 onwards. In May 2015, flights into the Northern city of Kunduz were suspended due to weeks of clashes between the Afghan security forces and the Taliban outside the city. The intensifying conflict in the Northern Char Dara District within the Kunduz province led the Afghan government to enlist local militia fighters to bolster opposition to the Taliban insurgency. In June, the Taliban intensified attacks around the Northern city of Kunduz as part of a major offensive in an attempt to capture the city. Tens of thousands of inhabitants were displaced internally by the fighting. The government recaptured the Char Dara district after roughly a month of fighting.

In late September, Taliban forces launched an attack on Kunduz, seizing several outlying villages and entering the city. The Taliban stormed the regional hospital and clashed with security forces at the nearby university. The fighting saw the Taliban attack from four different districts: Char Dara to the West, Aliabad to the Southwest, Khanabad to the East and Imam Saheb to the North. The Taliban took the Zakhel and Ali Khel villages on the highway leading south, which connects the city to Kabul and Mazar-e Sharif through Aliabad district, and reportedly made their largest gains in the Southwest of Kunduz, where some local communities had picked up weapons and supported the Taliban. Taliban fighters had allegedly blocked the route to the Airport to prevent civilians fleeing the city. One witness reported that the headquarters of the National Directorate of Security was set on fire. Kunduz was recaptured by Afghan and American forces on 14 October 2015.

Taliban negotiations and in-fighting 
China attempted to negotiate with the Taliban in 2016, as the Afghan security situation affects its own separatist groups, and economic activity with Pakistan. The Taliban declined.

The bombing of the Kabul parliament has highlighted differences within the Taliban in their approach to peace talks. In April 2016, President Ashraf Ghani "pulled the plug" on the Afghan governments failing effort to start peace talks with the Taliban. Additionally, due to the integration of Haqqani Networks into the Taliban leadership, it would become harder for peace talks to take place. Although leader of the Taliban, Haibatullah Akhundzada, said a peace agreement was possible if the government in Kabul renounced its foreign allies.

On 11 November 2015, it was reported that infighting had broken out between different Taliban factions in Zabul Province. Fighters loyal to the new Taliban leader Mullah Akhtar Mansoor fought a pro-ISIL splinter faction led by Mullah Mansoor Dadullah. Even though Dadullah's faction enjoyed the support of foreign ISIL fighters, including Uzbeks and Chechens, it was reported that Mansoor's Taliban loyalists had the upper hand. According to Ghulam Jilani Farahi, provincial director of security in Zabul, more than 100 militants from both sides were killed since the fighting broke out. The infighting has continued into 2016; on 10 March 2016, officials said that the Taliban clashed with the Taliban splinter group (led by Muhammad Rasul) in the Shindand district of Herat with up to 100 militants killed; the infighting has also stifled peace talks.

As a result of the infighting, which has resulted in Mansour being consumed with a campaign to quell dissent against his leadership; Sirajuddin Haqqani, chief of the Haqqani Network was selected to become the deputy leader of the Taliban in the summer of 2015, during a leadership struggle within the Taliban. Sirajuddin and other Haqqani leaders increasingly ran the day-to-day military operations for the Taliban, in particular; refining urban terrorist attacks and cultivating a sophisticated international fund-raising network, they also appointed Taliban governors and began uniting the Taliban. As a result, the Haqqani Network is now closely integrated with the Taliban at a leadership level, and is growing in influence within the insurgency, whereas the network was largely autonomous before, and there are concerns that the fighting is going to be deadlier. Tensions with the Pakistani military have also been raised because American and Afghan officials accuse them of sheltering the Haqqanis as a proxy group.

Clashes in Helmand 
In 2015 the Taliban began an offensive in Helmand Province, taking over parts of the Province. By June 2015, they had seized control of Dishu and Baghran killing 5,588 Afghan government security forces (3,720 of them were police officers). By the end of July, the Taliban had overrun Nawzad District and on 26 August, the Taliban took control of Musa Qala. In October 2015, Taliban forces had attempted to take Lashkar Gah; the capital of Helmand province, the Afghan's 215th Corps and special operations forces launched a counteroffensive against the Taliban in November, Whilst the assault was repelled, Taliban forces remained dug into the city's suburbs as of December 2015.
December 2015 saw a renewed Taliban offensive in Helmand focused on the town of Sangin. The Sangin district fell to the Taliban on 21 December after fierce clashes that killed more than 90 soldiers in two days. It was reported that 30 members of the SAS alongside 60 US special forces operators joined the Afghan Army in the Battle to retake parts of Sangin from Taliban insurgents, in addition, about 300 US troops and a small number of British remained in Helmand to advise Afghan commanders at the corps level. Senior American commanders said that the Afghan troops in the province have lacked effective leaders as well as the necessary weapons and ammunition to hold off persistent Taliban attacks. Some Afghan soldiers in Helmand have been fighting in tough conditions for years without a break to see their family, leading to poor morale and high desertion rates.

In early February 2016, Taliban insurgents renewed their assault on Sangin, after previously being repulsed in December 2015, launching a string of ferocious attacks on Afghan government forces earlier in the month. As a result, the United States decided to send troops from the 2nd Battalion, 87th Infantry Regiment, 10th Mountain Division, in order to prop up the Afghan 215th Corps in Helmand province, particularly around Sangin, joining US special operations forces already in the area. On 14 March 2016, Khanneshin District in Helmand Province fell to the Taliban; and district by district, Afghan troops were retreating back to urban centers in Helmand. In early April 2016, 600 Afghan troops launched a major offensive to retake Taliban-occupied areas of Sangin and the area around it, an Afghan army offensive to retake the town of Khanisheen was repelled by the Taliban, desertions from the army in the area are rife.

Despite US airstrikes, militants besieged Lashkar Gah, reportedly controlling all roads leading to the city and areas a few kilometres away. The US stepped up airstrikes in support of Afghan ground forces. Afghan forces in Lashkar Gah were reported as "exhausted" whilst police checkpoints around the capital were falling one by one; whilst the Taliban sent a new elite commando force into Helmand called "Sara Khitta" in Pashto. Afghan security forces beat back attacks by Taliban fighters encroaching on Chah-e-Anjir, just 10 km from Lashkar Gah; Afghan special forces backed by US airstrikes battled increasingly well-armed and disciplined Taliban militants. An Afghan special forces commander said "The Taliban have heavily armed, uniformed units that are equipped with night vision and modern weapons." On 22 August 2016, the US announced that 100 US troops were sent to Lashkar Gah to help prevent the Taliban from overrunning it, in what Brigadier General Charles Cleveland called a "temporary effort" to advise the Afghan police.

On 31 December 2016, the Taliban continued their assault on the province with attacks on Sangin and Marjah districts. Some estimated suggest the Taliban had retaken more than 80% of Helmand province. During the early hours of 23 March 2017 Sangin district was captured by the Taliban as they had overrun the district center, the town of Sangin. During the earlier phase of the war, almost a quarter of British casualties were caused by fighting for the town, while more recently hundreds of Afghan troops died defending it. On 29 April 2017, the US deployed an additional 5,000 Marines to the Southern Helmand Province.

Emergence of Islamic State 

In mid-January 2015, the Islamic State caliphate established a branch in Afghanistan called Khorasan (ISKP, or ISIS-K) and began recruiting fighters and clashing with the Taliban. It was created after pledging allegiance to the self-assumed worldwide caliph Abu Bakr al-Baghdadi. On 18 March, Hafiz Wahidi, ISIL's replacement deputy Emir in Afghanistan, was killed by the Afghan Armed Forces, along with 9 other ISIL militants accompanying him. In January 2016, the US government sent a directive to the Pentagon which granted new legal authority for the US military to go on the offensive against Militants affiliated with the ISIL-KP, after the State Department announced the designation of ISIS in Afghanistan and Pakistan as a foreign terrorist organization. The number of militants started with around 60 or 70, with most of them coming over the border with Pakistan but eventually ranged between 1,000 and 3,000 militants, mainly defectors from the Afghan and the Pakistani Taliban, and is generally confined to Nangarhar Province but also has/had a presence in Kunar province.

On 23 July 2016, Afghan and US forces began an offensive to clear Nangarhar province of Islamic State militants hours after the Kabul bombing, the operation was dubbed "Wrath of the Storm" involving both Afghan regular army and special forces and is the Afghan army's first major strategic offensive of the summer. The estimated size of the ISIL-KP in January 2016 was around 3,000, but by July 2016 the number had been reduced to closely 1,000 to 1,500, with 70% of its fighters come from the TTP.

The Army Times reported that in early March 2017, American and Afghan forces launched Operation Hamza to "flush" ISIS-K from its stronghold in eastern Afghanistan, engaging in regular ground battles. In April 2017, the Washington Post reported that Captain Bill Salvin, a spokesman for NATO's mission to Afghanistan, said that Afghan and international forces had reduced ISIS-K controlled territory in Afghanistan by two-thirds and had killed around half their fighters in the previous two years. Since the beginning of 2017, 460 airstrikes against terrorists (with drone strikes alone killing more than 200 IS militants); he added that the affiliate has an estimated 600–800 fighters in two eastern Afghan provinces.

On 15 September 2017, the New York Times reported that the CIA was seeking authority to conduct its own drone strikes in Afghanistan and other war zones, according to current and former intelligence and military officials, and that the change in authority was being considered by the White House as part of the new strategy despite concerns by the Pentagon. On 19 September 2017, the Trump Administration deployed another 3,000 US troops to Afghanistan. They would add to the approximately 11,000 US troops already serving in Afghanistan, bringing the total to at least 14,000 US troops stationed in Afghanistan. On 4 October 2017, Fox News reported that Defense Secretary Jim Mattis approved a change in rules of engagement as part of the new strategy so that there is no longer a requirement for US troops to be in contact with enemy forces in Afghanistan before opening fire.

2018–2020: Peace overtures 

In January 2018, the Taliban were openly active in 70% of the country (being in full control of 14 districts and have an active and open physical presence in a further 263) and the Islamic State was more active in the country than ever before. Following attacks by the Taliban (including the Kabul ambulance bombing on 27 January which killed over 100 people) and Islamic State that killed scores of civilians, President Trump and Afghan officials decided to rule out any talks with the Taliban. However, on 27 February 2018, following an increase in violence, Afghan President Ashraf Ghani proposed unconditional peace talks with the Taliban, offering them recognition as a legal political party and the release of the Taliban prisoners. The offer was the most favorable to the Taliban since the war started. It was preceded by months of national consensus building, which found that Afghans overwhelmingly supported a negotiated end to the war. Two days earlier, the Taliban had called for talks with the US, saying "It must now be established by America and her allies that the Afghan issue cannot be solved militarily. America must henceforth focus on a peaceful strategy for Afghanistan instead of war." On 27 March 2018, a conference of 20 countries in Tashkent, Uzbekistan, backed the Afghan government's peace offer. The Taliban did not publicly respond to Ghani's offer.

In July 2018 the Taliban carried out the Darzab offensive and captured Darzab District following the surrender of ISIL-K to the Afghan Government. In August the Taliban launched a series of offensives, the largest being the Ghazni offensive. During the Ghazni offensive, the Taliban seized Ghazni, Afghanistan's sixth-largest city for several days but eventually retreated.

On 25 January 2019, Afghanistan's president Ashraf Ghani said that more than 45,000 members of the Afghan security forces had been killed since he became president in 2014. He also said that there had been fewer than 72 international casualties during the same period. A January 2019 report by the US government estimated that 53.8% of Afghanistan's districts were controlled or influenced by the government, with 33.9% contested and 12.3% under insurgent control or influence.

On 30 April 2019, Afghan government forces undertook clearing operations directed against both ISIS-K and the Taliban in eastern Nangarhar Province, after the two groups fought for over a week over a group of villages in an area of illegal talc mining. The National Directorate of Security claimed 22 ISIS-K fighters were killed and two weapons caches destroyed, while the Taliban claimed US-backed Afghan forces killed seven civilians; a provincial official said over 9,000 families had been displaced by the fighting. On 28 July 2019, President Ashraf Ghani's running mate Amrullah Saleh's office was attacked by a suicide bomber and a few militants. At least 20 people were killed and 50 injured, with Saleh also amongst the injured ones. During the six-hour-long operation, more than 150 civilians were rescued and three militants were killed.

By August, the Taliban controlled more territory than at any point since 2001. The Washington Post reported that the US was close to reaching a peace deal with the Taliban and was preparing to withdraw 5,000 troops from Afghanistan. In September, the US canceled the negotiations.

National peace movements and first ceasefire 

Following Ghani's offer of unconditional peace talks with the Taliban, a growing peace movement arose in Afghanistan during 2018, particularly following a peace march by the People's Peace Movement, which the Afghan media dubbed the "Helmand Peace Convoy". The marchers walked several hundred kilometers from Lashkar Gah in Helmand Province, through Taliban-held territory, to Kabul. There they met Ghani and held sit-in protests outside the United Nations Assistance Mission in Afghanistan and nearby embassies. Their efforts inspired further movements in other parts of Afghanistan.

Following the march, Ghani and the Taliban agreed a mutual, unprecedented, ceasefire during the Eid al-Fitr celebrations in June 2018. During the Eid ceasefire, Taliban members flocked into Kabul where they met and communicated with locals and state security forces. Creating a mood of hope and fear, many civilians welcomed the Taliban and spoke about peace, including some women. Although civilians called for the ceasefire to be made permanent, the Taliban rejected an extension and resumed fighting after the ceasefire ended on 18 June, while the Afghan government's ceasefire ended a week later.

United States Institute of Peace researchers argue that there are nonviolent resistance movements in Afghanistan. They argued that in the mid-2010s, Afghan peace groups started pressuring both the Afghan government and the Taliban for ceasefires and to implement other steps in the peace process. The Tabassum movement arose in 2015, the Enlightenment Movement during 2016–2017, Uprising for Change in 2017, and the People's Peace Movement started in March 2018.

Between 29 April and 3 May 2019, the Afghan government hosted a four-day loya jirga (grand assembly) at Kabul's Bagh-e Bala Palace attended by 3,200 representatives to discuss peace talks. The Taliban were invited but did not attend. The event called for an immediate ceasefire with the Taliban and said that human rights must be protected. President Ghani also announced the release of a number of Taliban prisoners as a goodwill gesture.

2020: US-Taliban talks and agreement

American officials secretly met members of the Taliban's political commission in Qatar in July 2018. In September 2018, Trump appointed Zalmay Khalilzad as special adviser on Afghanistan in the US State Department, with the stated goal of facilitating an intra-Afghan political peace process. Khalilzad led further talks between the US and the Taliban in Qatar in October 2018. Russia hosted a separate peace talk in November 2018 between the Taliban and officials from Afghanistan's High Peace Council. The talks in Qatar resumed in December 2018, though the Taliban refused to allow the Afghan government to be invited, considering them a puppet government of the US. The Taliban spoke with Afghans including former President Hamid Karzai at a hotel in Moscow in February 2019, but again these talks did not include the Afghan government.

On 25 February 2019, peace talks began between the Taliban and the United States in Qatar, with the Taliban co-founder Abdul Ghani Baradar notably present. Peace negotiations had resumed in December 2019. This round of talks resulted in a seven-day partial ceasefire which began on 22 February 2020. On 29 February, the United States and the Taliban signed a conditional peace deal in Doha, Qatar that called for a prisoner exchange within ten days and was supposed to lead to US troops withdrawal from Afghanistan within 14 months. However, the Afghan government was not a party to the deal, and, in a press conference the next day, President Ghani criticized the deal for being "signed behind closed doors". He said the Afghan government had "made no commitment to free 5,000 Taliban prisoners" and that such an action "is not the United States' authority, but it is the authority of the government of Afghanistan." Ghani also stated that any prisoner exchange
"cannot be a prerequisite for talks" but rather must be negotiated within the talks."

Insurgents belonging to al-Qaeda in the Indian subcontinent and ISIL-K, not part of the deal, continued to operate in parts of the country and hoped to attract the most intransigent sector of the Taliban to their cause.

Spike in violence and prisoners dispute 

After signing the agreement with the United States, the Taliban resumed offensive operations against the Afghan army and police on 3 March, conducting attacks in Kunduz and Helmand provinces. On 4 March, the United States retaliated by launching an air strike against Taliban fighters in Helmand. Despite the peace agreement between the US and the Taliban, insurgent attacks against Afghan security forces were reported to have surged in the country. In the 45 days after the agreement (between 1 March and 15 April 2020), the Taliban conducted more than 4,500 attacks in Afghanistan, which showed an increase of more than 70% as compared to the same period in the previous year. More than 900 Afghan security forces were killed in the period, up from about 520 in the same period a year earlier. Because of a significant reduction in the number of offensives and airstrikes by Afghan and US forces against the Taliban due to the agreement, Taliban casualties dropped to 610 in the period down from about 1,660 in the same period a year earlier. Meanwhile ISIS-K continued to be a threat on its own, killing 32 people in a mass shooting in Kabul on 6 March, killing 25 Sikh worshippers at a Kabul temple on 25 March, and a series of attacks in May most notably killing 16 mothers and newborn babies at a Kabul hospital maternity ward. Since the US withdrawal, the number of casualties of women in the Afghanistan conflict rose by almost 40% in the first quarter of 2021 alone.

On 22 June 2020, Afghanistan reported its "bloodiest week in 19 years", during which 291 members of the Afghan National Defense and Security Forces (ANDSF) were killed and 550 others wounded in 422 attacks carried out by the Taliban. At least 42 civilians, including women and children, were also killed and 105 others wounded by the Taliban across 18 provinces. During the week, the Taliban kidnapped 60 civilians in the central province of Daykundi.

2020–2021: US withdrawal 

The Taliban insurgency intensified considerably in 2021 coinciding with the withdrawal of United States and allied troops from Afghanistan.

On the diplomatic front, on 31 March 2020 a three-person Taliban delegation arrived in Kabul to discuss the release of prisoners. They are the first Taliban representatives to visit Kabul since 2001. On 7 April 2020, the Taliban departed from the prisoner swap talks, which Taliban spokesman Suhail Shaheen described as "fruitless". Shaheen also stated in a tweet that hours after walking out of the talks, the Taliban's negotiating team was recalled from Kabul. The Taliban also failed to secure the release of any of the 15 commanders they sought to be released. Arguments over which prisoners to swap also resulted in a delay of the planned prisoner swap. After a long delay due to disputes regarding prisoners' releases, the Afghan government had by August 2020 released 5,100 prisoners, and the Taliban had released 1,000. However, the Afghan government refused to release 400 prisoners from the list of those the Taliban wanted to be released, because those 400 were accused of serious crimes. President Ghani stated that he did not have the constitutional authority to release these prisoners, so he convened a loya jirga from 7 to 9 August to discuss the issue. The jirga agreed to free the 400 remaining prisoners. Talks between the Afghan government and the Taliban began in Doha on 12 September 2020.

Taliban's summer offensive, capture of Kabul and Taliban's victory 

The Taliban began its last major offensive on 1 May 2021, culminating in the fall of Kabul, a Taliban victory, and the end of war. In the first three months of the offensive, the Taliban made significant territorial gains in the countryside, increasing the number of districts it controlled from 73 to 223.

On March 6, Afghanistan's President Ashraf Ghani expressed that his government would be taking forward peace talks with the Taliban, discussing with the insurgent group about holding fresh elections and forming a government in a democratic manner. On April 13, the Biden administration announced that it would withdraw its remaining 2,500 troops from Afghanistan by September 11, 2021, on the twentieth anniversary of the September 11 attacks. The US government also reiterated support for the Afghan government regarding a possible Taliban military victory. On July 5, the Taliban announced their intention to present a written peace plan to the Afghan Government in August but as of August 13, this had not been done. Sources claimed that on August 12, Abdullah Abdullah, the Chairman of the High Council for National Reconciliation, handed in a plan titled “exiting the crisis” which was shared with the Taliban. The sources say that the plan calls for the creation of a "joint government". On August 15, following the Taliban offensive and the fall of the capital Kabul, the Taliban occupied the Presidential Palace after the incumbent President Ashraf Ghani fled the country to Tajikistan. NATO forces maintain a presence in Kabul.

The Taliban gained control of various towns throughout June and July. On 6 August, they captured the first provincial capital of Zaranj. Over the next ten days, they swept across the country, capturing capital after capital. On 14 August, Mazar-i-Sharif was captured as commanders Rashid Dostum and Atta Nur fled across the border to Uzbekistan, cutting Kabul's vital northern supply route. In the early hours of 15 August, Jalalabad fell, cutting the only remaining international route through the Khyber Pass. By noon of that day, Taliban forces advanced from the Paghman district reaching the gates of Kabul; President Ashraf Ghani discussed the city's protection with security ministers, while sources claimed a unity peace agreement with the Taliban was imminent. However, Ghani was unable to reach top officials in the interior and defense ministries, and several high-profile politicians had already hurried to the airport. By 1400 hours, the Taliban had entered the city facing no resistance; the president soon fled by helicopter from the Presidential Palace, and within hours Taliban fighters were pictured sitting at Ghani's desk in the palace. With the virtual collapse of the republic, the war was declared over by the Taliban on the same day.

Airlifts and final US exit 

As the Taliban seized control on 15 August 2021, the need to evacuate populations vulnerable to the Taliban, including the interpreters and assistants who had worked with the coalition forces, ethnic minorities, and women, became urgent. For more than two weeks, international diplomatic, military and civilian staff, as well as Afghan civilians, were airlifted out the country from Hamid Karzai International Airport. On 16 August Major General Hank Taylor confirmed that US air strikes had ended at least 24 hours earlier and that the focus of the US military at that point was maintaining security at the airport as evacuations continued. The final flight, a US Air Force C-17, departed at 3:29 pm ET, 11:59 p.m. in Kabul time, on 30 August 2021, marking the end of the American campaign in Afghanistan and followed by celebratory gunfire by Taliban. Many observers have noted this as the end of America's longest war in history.

Impact

Casualties 
According to the Costs of War Project at Brown University, the war killed 46,319 Afghan civilians in Afghanistan. However, the death toll is possibly higher due to unaccounted deaths by "disease, loss of access to food, water, infrastructure, and/or other indirect consequences of the war". A report titled Body Count put together by Physicians for Social Responsibility, Physicians for Global Survival and International Physicians for the Prevention of Nuclear War (IPPNW) concluded that 106,000–170,000 civilians have been killed as a result of the fighting in Afghanistan at the hands of all parties to the conflict.

The majority of civilian casualties were attributed to anti-government elements each year, though the figure varied from 61% to 80%, with the average hovering around 75% due to the Taliban and other anti-government elements. The United Nations Assistance Mission in Afghanistan (UNAMA) started publishing civilian casualty figures in 2008. These figures attribute approximately 41% of civilian casualties to government aligned forces in 2008; this percentage lowers to approximately 18% in 2015.

Civilian deaths caused by non-Afghan Coalition forces were low later in the war after most foreign troops were withdrawn and the coalition shifted to airstrikes. For example, in 2015 pro-government forces caused 17% of civilian deaths and injuries – including United States and NATO troops, which were responsible for only 2% of the casualties. 2016 had a similar 2% figure. Civilian deaths were higher as well in the latter part of the war, with 2015 and 2016 both consecutively breaking the record of annual civilian deaths according to the UN.

Refugees 

Since 2001, more than 5.7 million former refugees have returned to Afghanistan, but 2.6 million others remained refugees in 2021 when the Taliban took over, while another 4 million were internally displaced. 

Following the Taliban takeover, over 122,000 people were airlifted abroad from Kabul airport, during the evacuation from Afghanistan, including Afghans, American citizens, and other foreign citizens. A year after, the United States had accepted over 85,000 Afghan refugees, many of whom had been processed in Europe and the Middle East. The United Arab Emirates agreed to temporarily host Afghan refugees in Abu Dhabi on behalf of other nations. Over 10,000 have been resettled to the United States from Abu Dhabi, but 12,000 remained there as of August 2022, leading to protests by refugees over the resettlement process and living conditions.

War crimes 

 
War crimes (a serious violation of the laws and customs of war giving rise to individual criminal responsibility) have been committed by both sides including civilian massacres, bombings of civilian targets, terrorism, use of torture and the murder of prisoners of war. Additional common crimes include theft, arson, and destruction of property not warranted by military necessity.

The Taliban committed war crimes during the war including massacres, suicide bombing, terrorism, and targeting civilians (such as using human shields). United Nations reports have consistently blamed the Taliban and other anti-government forces for the majority of civilian deaths in the conflict. Other crimes include mass rape and executing surrendered soldiers.

War crimes committed by the Coalition, Afghan security forces, and Northern Alliance included massacres, prisoner mistreatment, and killings of civilians. Amnesty International accused the Pentagon of covering up evidence related to war crimes, torture and unlawful killings in Afghanistan. Notable incidents include the Dasht-i-Leili massacre, Bagram torture and prisoner abuse, Kandahar massacre, among others.

In 2020, the International Criminal Court investigation in Afghanistan formally commenced, investigating war crimes and crimes against humanity committed by all parties in Afghanistan since 1 May 2013.

Health and education 

Between 2001 and 2021, Afghanistan experienced improvements in health, education and women's rights. Life expectancy increased from 56 to 64 years and the maternal mortality rate was reduced by half. 89% of residents living in cities have access to clean water, up from 16% in 2001. The rate of child marriage has been reduced by 17%. The population of Afghanistan increased by more than 50% between 2001 and 2014, while its GDP grew eightfold.

As of 2013, 8.2 million Afghans attended school, up from 1.2 million in 2001. 3.2 million girls attended school in 2013, up from fewer than 50,000 in 2001. 39% of girls were attending school in 2017 compared to 6% in 2003. In 2021, a third of students at university were women and 27% of members of parliament were women. The literacy rate in 2021 has risen from 8% to 43% since 2001. In 2018, UNICEF reported that 3.7 million children between the ages of 7 and 17, or 44 percent, were not attending school.

Drug trade 

In 2000, Afghanistan accounted for an estimated 75% of the world's opium supply, which was the Taliban's largest source of revenue though taxes on opium exports. Mullah Omar banned opium cultivation in 2001, which observers said was an attempt to gain international recognition, raise opium prices and increase profit from the sale of large existing stockpiles. Opium production increased in the years following the October 2001 invasion, with Afghanistan producing 90% of the world's opium by 2005. According to a 2018 SIGAR report, the U.S. had spent $8.6 billion since 2002 to stop Afghanistan's drug trade. A May 2021 SIGAR report estimated that the Taliban earned 60% of their revenue from the trade, while UN officials estimated more than $400 million was earned by the Taliban between 2018 and 2019, however other experts estimated that the Taliban earned at most $40 million annually.

NATO's inability to stabilize Afghanistan 

Observers have argued that the mission in Afghanistan was hampered by a lack of agreement on objectives, a lack of resources, lack of coordination, too much focus on the central government at the expense of local and provincial governments, and too much focus on the country instead of the region.

Environment and drug trade
According to Cara Korte, climate change played a significant role in increasing instability in Afghanistan and strengthening the Taliban. More than 60% of the Afghan population depend on agriculture and Afghanistan is the sixth most vulnerable country to climate change in the world according to the United Nations Environment Program and Afghanistan's National Environmental Protection Agency. The Taliban used resentment over government inaction to climate change-induced drought and flooding to strengthen its support and Afghans were able to earn more money supporting the Taliban than from farming.

Despite efforts to eradicate poppy, Afghanistan remained the world's largest producer of illicate opiate by the end of the war. The Taliban profited at least tens of millions of dollars from opium and heroin annually as of 2018.

Early mistakes and the US's other war
Journalist Jason Burke notes "strategic mistakes by the US and allies in the immediate aftermath of the 2001 invasion" as being a reason why the war went on for so long. He also noted "missed early opportunities" to "construct a stable political settlement".

Steve Coll believes that "No small part of N.A.T.O.'s ultimate failure to stabilize Afghanistan flowed from the disastrous decision by George W. Bush to invade Iraq in 2003. ... The Taliban's comeback, America's initial inattention to it, and the attraction for some Afghans and Pakistanis of the Taliban's ideology of national resistance under Islamic principles—all these sources of failure cannot be understood in isolation from the Iraq war." Coll further notes that neither the Bush nor the Obama administrations achieved consensus on key questions such as the relative importance of nation-building versus counterterrorism, whether the stability of Afghanistan took priority over that of Pakistan, or the role of the drug trade, although "the failure to solve the riddle of I.S.I. and to stop its covert interference in Afghanistan became ... the greatest strategic failure of the American war."

Domestic corruption and politics

In 2009, Afghanistan was ranked as the world's second most-corrupt country. A lengthy report by SIGAR, and other findings, found that spiraling corruption in Afghanistan during the 2000s was not halted by the United States. During this time, many elite figures in the country had effectively become kleptocrats, while ordinary Afghans were struggling.

It has been argued that the restoration of monarchy in Afghanistan should not have been vetoed, as this may have provided stability to the country.

Influence of non-NATO actors
Pakistan played a central role in the conflict. A 2010 report published by the London School of Economics says that Pakistan's ISI has an "official policy" of support to the Taliban. "Pakistan appears to be playing a double-game of astonishing magnitude," the report states. Regarding the Afghan War documents leak published by WikiLeaks, Der Spiegel wrote that "the documents clearly show that the Pakistani intelligence agency Inter-Services Intelligence (usually known as the ISI) is the most important accomplice the Taliban has outside of Afghanistan". Amrullah Saleh, former director of Afghanistan's intelligence service, stated, "We talk about all these proxies [Taliban, Haqqanis] but not the master of proxies, which is the Pakistan army. The question is what does Pakistan's army want to achieve ...? They want to gain influence in the region." Pakistan's role can be traced back to the Soviet war in which they funded the Mujahideen against the Soviets. Pakistan's objective then as it is now is to ensure that Afghanistan has a regime friendly to their interests and will provide "geopolitical depth in any future conflict with India".

Iran also sought to influence the war. During the course of the war, the US took out two of Iran's regional enemies: Saddam Hussein through the Iraq War as well as the Taliban. Saudi Arabia and Pakistan are other 'dominant players' that influenced the war. Iran and the Taliban formed ties, with Russian assistance as well, to 'bleed' the American force. Iran  emboldened by their alliance in the Syrian Civil War, initiated a 'proxy war' in Afghanistan against the US. The Taliban received economic support from Dubai, UAE and Bahrain. Pakistan has given economic support and encouraged increased Iran-Taliban ties.

China has been quietly expanding its influence. Since 2010 China has signed mining contracts with Kabul and is building a military base in Badakshan to counter regional terrorism (from the ETIM). China has donated billions of dollars in aid over the years to Afghanistan, which plays a strategic role in the Belt and Road Initiative. Additionally, after 2011 Pakistan expanded its economic and military ties to China as a hedge against dependency on the US. Coll observes that "Overall, the war left China with considerable latitude in Central Asia, without having made any expenditure of blood, treasure, or reputation."

American public misleading
In December 2019 The Washington Post published 2,000 pages of government documents, mostly transcripts of interviews with more than 400 key figures involved in prosecuting the Afghanistan war. According to the Post and The Guardian, the documents (dubbed the Afghanistan Papers) showed that US officials consistently and deliberately misled the American public about the unwinnable nature of the conflict, and some commentators and foreign policy experts subsequently drew comparisons to the release of the Pentagon Papers. The Post obtained the documents from the Office of the Special Inspector General for Afghanistan Reconstruction, via Freedom of Information Act requests, after a three-year legal battle.

Foreign support for the Taliban

Pakistan
The Taliban's victory was facilitated in support from Pakistan. Although Pakistan was a major US ally before and after the 2001 invasion of Afghanistan, elements of the Pakistan government (including the military and intelligence services) have for decades maintained strong logistical and tactical ties with Taliban militants, and this support helped support the insurgency in Afghanistan. For example, the Haqqani Network, a Taliban affiliate based on Pakistan, had strong support from Inter-Services Intelligence (ISI), the Pakistan intelligence agency. Taliban leaders found a safe haven in Pakistan, lived in the country, transacted business and earned funds there, and receiving medical treatment there. Some elements of the Pakistani establishment sympathized with Taliban ideology, and many Pakistan officials considered the Taliban as an asset against India. Bruce Riedel noted that "The Pakistan Army believes Afghanistan provides strategic depth against India, which is their obsession."

Russia and Iran
In the initial aftermath of the September 11, 2001 attacks, Iranian forces, led by Revolutionary Guard Commander Qassem Suleimani initially cooperated, secretly, with American officials against Al-Qaeda operatives and the Taliban, but that cooperation ended after the Axis of Evil Speech on January 29, 2002, which included calling Iran a major state sponsor of terror and threat to peace in the region. Afterwards, Iranian forces became increasingly hostile to American forces in the region.

Dr. Antonio Giustozzi, a senior research fellow at Royal United Services Institute on terrorism and conflict, wrote, "Both the Russians and the Iranians helped the Taliban advance at a breakneck pace in May–August 2021. They contributed to funding and equipping them, but perhaps even more importantly they helped them by brokering deals with parties, groups, and personalities close to either country, or even both. […] The Revolutionary Guards helped the Taliban's advance in western Afghanistan, including by lobbying various strongmen and militia commanders linked to Iran not to resist the Taliban."

Reactions

Domestic reactions 
In November 2001, the CNN reported widespread relief amongst Kabul's residents after the Taliban fled the city, with young men shaving off their beards and women taking off their burqas. Later that month the BBC's longtime Kabul correspondent Kate Clark reported that "almost all women in Kabul are still choosing to veil" but that many felt hopeful that the ousting of the Taliban would improve their safety and access to food.

A 2006 WPO opinion poll found that the majority of Afghans endorsed America's military presence, with 83% of Afghans stating that they had a favorable view of the US military forces in their country. Only 17% gave an unfavorable view. 82% of Afghans, among all ethnic groups including Pashtuns, stated that the overthrowing of the Taliban was a good thing. However, the majority of Afghans held negative views on Pakistan and most Afghans also stated that they believe that the Pakistani government was allowing the Taliban to operate from its soil.

A 2015 survey by Langer Research Associates found that 80% of Afghans held the view that it was a good thing for the United States to overthrow the Taliban in 2001. More Afghans blamed the Taliban or al-Qaeda for the country's violence (53%) than those who blame the US (12%). A 2019 survey by The Asia Foundation found that 13.4% of Afghans had sympathy for the Taliban while 85.1% of respondents had no sympathy for the group. 88.6% of urban residents had no sympathy compared to 83.9% of rural residents.

International public opinion 

In October 2001 when the invasion began, polls indicated that about 88% of Americans and about 65% of Britons backed military action. An Ipsos-Reid poll conducted between November and December 2001 showed that majorities in Canada (66%), France (60%), Germany (60%), Italy (58%), and the UK (65%) approved of US airstrikes while majorities in Argentina (77%), China (52%), South Korea (50%), Spain (52%), and Turkey (70%) opposed them.

In 2008 there was a strong opposition to war in Afghanistan in 21 of 24 countries surveyed. Only in the US and Great Britain did half the people support the war, with a larger percentage (60%) in Australia. Of the seven NATO countries in the survey, not one showed a majority in favor of keeping NATO troops in Afghanistan – one, the US, came close to a majority (50%). Of the other six NATO countries, five had majorities of their population wanting NATO troops removed from Afghanistan as soon as possible. An April 2011 Pew Research Center poll showed little change in American views, with about 50% saying that the effort was going very well or fairly well and only 44% supporting NATO troop presence in Afghanistan.

Protests, demonstrations and rallies 

The war has been the subject of large protests around the world starting with the large-scale demonstrations in the days leading up to the invasion and every year since. Many protesters consider the bombing and invasion of Afghanistan to be unjustified aggression. Dozens of organizations held a national march for peace in Washington, D.C. on 20 March 2010.

Aftermath

Formation of the Taliban government and international recognition 

On 7 September 2021, an interim government headed by Mohammad Hassan Akhund as Prime Minister was declared by the Taliban. According to a Human Rights Watch's report released in November 2021, the Taliban killed or forcibly disappeared more than 100 former members of the Afghan security forces in the three months since the takeover in just the four provinces of Ghazni, Helmand, Kandahar, and Kunduz. According to the report, the Taliban identified targets for arrest and execution through intelligence operations and access to employment records that were left behind. Former members of the security forces were also killed by the Taliban within days of registering with them to receive a letter guaranteeing their safety.

In December 2021, the US Congress established the Afghanistan War Commission as an independent task force set up to study the entirety of US military operations in Afghanistan from 2001 to 2021. This commission was formally authorized as part of the 2023 National Defense Authorization Act. The commission has been given four years to undertake an investigation and produce a comprehensive report.

Republican insurgency 

On 17 August 2021, Vice President Amrullah Saleh, citing provisions of the Constitution of Afghanistan, declared himself President of Afghanistan from a base of operations in the Panjshir Valley, which had not been taken by Taliban forces, and vowed to continue military operations against the Taliban from there. His claim to the presidency was endorsed by Ahmad Massoud and Islamic Republic of Afghanistan Minister of Defence Bismillah Khan Mohammadi. By 6 September the Taliban had regained control over most of the valley, but armed resistance continued in the upper valleys. Clashes in the valley mostly ceased by mid-September. The leaders of the resistance, Saleh and Massoud reportedly fled to neighboring Tajikistan in late September. However, fighting between Taliban and pro-republican forces continued in other provinces. Several regions had become the site of a guerrilla campaign by early 2022. The NRF launched an offensive in May 2022, reportedly retaking territory in Panjshir. Other pro-republican rebel groups also emerged, including the "Ahmad Khan Samangani Front", "Afghan Freedom Front", "Afghanistan Islamic National & Liberation Movement", and several smaller factions.

Islamic State activity 

Following the 2021 Kabul airport attack conducted by the terrorist group Islamic State of Iraq and the Levant – Khorasan Province (a branch of the ISIL), the US said it could work with the Taliban to fight against the ISIS terrorists as part of the International military intervention against ISIL.

Humanitarian crisis 
Following the Taliban takeover, western nations suspended humanitarian aid and the World Bank and International Monetary Fund also halted payments to Afghanistan. The Biden administration froze about $9 billion in assets belonging to the Afghan central banks, blocking the Taliban from accessing billions of dollars held in US bank accounts. In October 2021, the UN stated that more than half of Afghanistan's 39 million people faced an acute food shortage. On 11 November 2021, the Human Rights Watch reported that Afghanistan is facing widespread famine due to collapsed economy and broken banking system. World leaders pledged $1.2 billion in humanitarian aid to Afghanistan. On 22 December 2021, The United Nations Security Council unanimously adopted a US-proposed resolution to help humanitarian aid reach desperate Afghans, while seeking to keep funds out of Taliban hands.”

On 29 August 2022, U.N. humanitarian chief, Martin Griffiths, warned about Afghanistan’s deepening poverty with 6 million people at risk of famine. He stated that conflict, poverty, climate shocks and food insecurity “have long been a sad reality” in Afghanistan, but almost a year after the Taliban takeover, halt to large-scale development aid have made the situation critical.

See also 

 List of military operations in the war in Afghanistan (2001–2021)
 List of aviation accidents and incidents in the war in Afghanistan
 US government response to the September 11 attacks
 Criticism of the war on terror
 Opposition to the War in Afghanistan (2001–2021)
 Afghanistan–United States relations
 Afghanistan Papers
 Afghan War documents leak
 NATO logistics in the Afghan War
 US–Afghanistan Strategic Partnership Agreement
 Provincial Reconstruction Team
 Withdrawal of United States troops from Afghanistan (2011–2016)
 Withdrawal of United States troops from Afghanistan (2020–2021)
 Soviet–Afghan War
 Insurgency in Khyber Pakhtunkhwa
 National Resistance Front of Afghanistan
 List of conflicts in Asia
 List of Afghanistan War (2001–2021) documentaries
 The American War in Afghanistan: A History nonfiction book by Carter Malkasian 2021. 
 Environmental impacts of war in Afghanistan

Notes

References

Sources 
 
 
 
 
 Auerswald, David P. & Stephen M. Saideman, eds. NATO in Afghanistan: Fighting Together, Fighting Alone (Princeton U.P. 2014) This book breaks down the history of the US effort in Afghanistan down by deployed commander. Also useful in this fashion are Kaplan, "The Insurgents", and "A Different Kind of War".
 Mikulaschek, Christoph and Jacob Shapiro. (2018). Lessons on Political Violence from America's Post-9/11 Wars. Journal of Conflict Resolution 62(1): 174–202.
 Münch, Philipp. "Creating common sense: getting NATO to Afghanistan." Journal of Transatlantic Studies (2021): 1–29 online.

Further reading 
 
 Bose, Srinjoy, ed. Afghanistan – Challenges and Prospects (Routledge, 2018).
 Robert Gates, Duty: Memoirs of a Secretary at War, New York, Alfred A. Knopf, 2014.

External links

 75,000 documents  on Wikileaks

 
2001
2001 in Afghanistan
2000s in Afghanistan
2010s in Afghanistan
2020s in Afghanistan
2000s conflicts
2010s conflicts
2020s conflicts
21st century in Afghanistan
Afghanistan–Pakistan relations
Afghanistan–United States relations
Aftermath of the September 11 attacks
International Security Assistance Force
Invasions by Australia
Invasions by Canada
Invasions by the United Kingdom
Invasions by the United States
Invasions of Afghanistan
Presidency of Barack Obama
Presidency of Donald Trump
Presidency of George W. Bush
Presidency of Joe Biden
Al-Qaeda
Haqqani network
Taliban
United States involvement in regime change
Wars involving Afghanistan
Wars involving Albania
Wars involving Armenia
Wars involving Australia
Wars involving Austria
Wars involving Azerbaijan
Wars involving Bahrain
Wars involving Belgium
Wars involving Bosnia and Herzegovina
Wars involving Bulgaria
Wars involving Canada
Wars involving Croatia
Wars involving Denmark
Wars involving El Salvador
Wars involving Estonia
Wars involving Finland
Wars involving France
Wars involving Georgia (country)
Wars involving Germany
Wars involving Greece
Wars involving Hungary
Wars involving Iceland
Wars involving Ireland
Wars involving Italy
Wars involving Jordan
Wars involving Latvia
Wars involving Lithuania
Wars involving Luxembourg
Wars involving Malaysia
Wars involving Mongolia
Wars involving Montenegro
Wars involving NATO
Wars involving New Zealand
Wars involving North Macedonia
Wars involving Norway
Wars involving Pakistan
Wars involving Poland
Wars involving Portugal
Wars involving Romania
Wars involving Singapore
Wars involving Slovakia
Wars involving Slovenia
Wars involving South Korea
Wars involving Spain
Wars involving Sweden
Wars involving Switzerland
Wars involving Tajikistan
Wars involving the Czech Republic
Wars involving the Netherlands
Wars involving the United Arab Emirates
Wars involving the United Kingdom
Afghanistan
Wars involving Tonga
Wars involving Turkey
Wars involving Ukraine